

Measures of the National Assembly for Wales

|-
| {{|Rights of Children and Young Persons (Wales) Measure 2011|cyshort=Mesur Hawliau Plant a Phobl Ifanc (Cymru) 2011|nawm|2|16-03-2011|maintained=y|url=mesur-hawliau-plant-phobl-ifanc-cymru-rights-of-children-and-young-persons-wales-measure|A Measure of the National Assembly for Wales to make provision for and in connection with giving further effect in Wales to the rights and obligations set out in the United Nations Convention on the Rights of the Child; and for connected purposes.|cylong=Mesur gan Gynulliad Cenedlaethol Cymru i wneud darpariaeth ynghylch ac mewn cysylltiad â rhoi effaith bellach yng Nghymru i'r hawliau a'r rhwymedigaethau a roddir yng Nghonfensiwn y Cenhedloedd Unedig ar Hawliau'r Plentyn; ac at ddibenion cysylltiedig.}}
|-
| {{|Domestic Fire Safety (Wales) Measure 2011|cyshort=Mesur Diogelwch Tân Domestig (Cymru) 2011|nawm|3|07-04-2011|maintained=y|url=mesur-diogelwch-tan-domestig-cymru-domestic-fire-safety-wales-measure|A Measure of the National Assembly for Wales to require the provision of automatic fire suppression systems in new residential premises in Wales.|cylong=Mesur gan Gynulliad Cenedlaethol Cymru i'w gwneud yn ofynnol i ddarparu systemau llethu tân awtomatig mewn mangreoedd preswyl newydd yng Nghymru.}}
|-
| {{|Local Government (Wales) Measure 2011|cyshort=Mesur Llywodraeth Leol (Cymru) 2011|nawm|4|10-05-2011|maintained=y|url=mesur-llywodraeth-leol-cymru-local-government-wales-measure-2|A Measure of the National Assembly for Wales to make provision for and in connection with the promotion of, and support for, membership of county and county borough councils; the provision of staff and other resources by county and county borough councils in connection with the councils' democratic services; family absence for members of county and county borough councils; governance arrangements of county and county borough councils; the discharge of functions of county and county borough councils by committees and members; overview and scrutiny committees of county and county borough councils; audit committees of county and county borough councils; communities and community councils; pensions and other payments for members of county and county borough councils, community councils, National Park authorities, and fire and rescue authorities; collaboration in local government; and for connected purposes.|cylong=Mesur gan Gynulliad Cenedlaethol Cymru i wneud darpariaeth ar gyfer ac mewn cysylltiad â hybu aelodaeth a rhoi cymorth i aelodaeth cynghorau sir a chynghorau bwrteistref sirol; darparu staff ac adnoddau eraill gan gynghorau sir a chynghorau bwrteistref sirol mewn cysylltiad â gwasanaethau democrataidd y cynghorau; absenoldeb teuluol i aelodau o gynghorau sir a chynghorau bwrteistref sirol; trefniadau llywodraethu cynghorau sir a chynghorau bwrteistref sirol; cyflawni swyddogaethau cynghorau sir a chynghorau bwrteistref sirol gan bwyllgorau a chan aelodau; pwyllgorau trosolwg a chraffu cynghorau sir a chynghorau bwrteistref sirol; pwyllgorau archwilio cynghorau sir a chynghorau bwrteistref sirol; cymunedau a chynghorau cymuned; pensiynau a thaliadau eraill i aelodau o gynghorau sir a chynghorau bwrteistref sirol, cynghorau cymuned, awdurdodau Parciau Cenedlaethol, ac awdurdodau tân ac achub; cydlafurio mewn llywodraeth leol; ac at ddibenion cysylltiedig.}}
|-
| {{|Housing (Wales) Measure 2011|cyshort=Mesur Tai (Cymru) 2011|nawm|5|10-05-2011|maintained=y|url=mesur-tai-cymru-housing-wales-measure|A Measure of the National Assembly for Wales to make provision for the suspension of the right to buy under the Housing Act 1985 and related rights; to make further provision about the regulation of registered social landlords and the enforcement action that may be taken against them; to make further provision as regards the insolvency of registered social landlords; and for connected purposes.|cylong=Mesur Cynulliad Cenedlaethol Cymru i wneud darpariaeth ar gyfer atal dros dro yr hawl i brynu o dan Ddeddf Tai 1985 a hawliau cysylltiedig, i wneud darpariaeth bellach ynghylch rheoleiddio landlordiaid cymdeithasol cofrestredig a'r camau gorfodi y caniateir eu cymryd yn eu herbyn, i wneud darpariaeth bellach ynghylch ansolfedd landlordiaid cymdeithasol cofrestredig, ac at ddibenion cysylltiedig.}}
|-
| {{|Safety on Learner Transport (Wales) Measure 2011|cyshort=Mesur Diogelwch ar Gludiant i Ddysgwyr (Cymru) 2011|nawm|6|10-05-2011|maintained=y|url=mesur-diogelwch-ar-gludiant-i-ddysgwyr-cymru-safety-on-learner-transport-wales-measure|A Measure of the National Assembly for Wales to make provision about safety on transport provided or otherwise secured by local authorities or governing bodies of maintained schools for the purpose of ensuring the attendance of children at places where they receive education or training; and for connected purposes.|cylong=Mesur gan Gynulliad Cenedlaethol Cymru i ddarparu am ddiogelwch ar gludiant a ddarperir neu a sicrheir fel arall gan awdurdodau lleol neu gyrff llywodraethu ysgolion a gynhelir at ddibenion sicrhau bod plant yn mynychu mannau lle y cânt eu haddysgu neu eu hyfforddi; ac at ddibenion cysylltiedig.}}
|-
| {{|Education (Wales) Measure 2011|cyshort=Mesur Addysg (Cymru) 2011|nawm|7|10-05-2011|maintained=y|url=mesur-addysg-cymru-education-wales-measure-2|A Measure of the National Assembly for Wales to make provision for collaboration between local authorities, governing bodies of maintained schools and further education institutions; to make provision for the federation of maintained schools, the training of governors and clerks to governing bodies of maintained schools and the provision of such clerks; to make provision prohibiting new foundation schools; and for connected purposes.|cylong=Mesur gan Gynulliad Cenedlaethol Cymru i wneud darpariaeth ar gyfer cydlafurio rhwng awdurdodau lleol, cyrff llywodraethu ysgolion a gynhelir a sefydliadau addysg bellach; gwneud darpariaeth ar gyfer ffedereiddio ysgolion a gynhelir, hyfforddi llywodraethwyr a chlercod cyrff llywodraethu ysgolion a gynhelir a darparu'r cyfryw glercod; gwneud darpariaeth sy'n gwahardd ysgolion sefydledig newydd; ac at ddibenion cysylltiedig.}}
}}

References

Wales law-related lists